An information minister (also called minister of information) is a position in the governments of some countries responsible for dealing with information matters; it is often linked with censorship and propaganda. Sometimes the position is given to a separate Minister of Culture.

Information ministries by country
: Ministry of Information and Broadcasting
: Ministry of Information
: Director of Information Services
: Ministry of Information and Broadcasting
: Ministry of Communication and Information Technology
: Ministry of Information (Lebanon)
: Minister of Communications and Multimedia (Malaysia)
: Minister of Information and Communication Technology
: Minister of Information and Communications
: Ministry of Information Society and Administration
: Information Minister
: Presidential Communications Group (Philippines)
: Minister of Culture and Information
: Ministry of Information (Serbia)
: Minister of Information, Communications and the Arts
: Ministry of Science and ICT
: Minister of Information and Communication Technology
: Minister of Culture and Information Policy
: Minister of Information and Communications

Historic information ministries for propaganda and war
: Information Minister (a historical position during the presidency of Saddam Hussein)
: Minister of Public Enlightenment and Propaganda (a historical position in Nazi Germany)
: Ministry of Culture and Enlightenment (a historical position in German occupation of Norway during World War II)
: Minister of National Enlightenment (a historical position in Imperial Russia before the 1917 Russian Revolution)
: Minister of Information (a historical position in the British government during the First and World War II)
: Office of War Information (served as the connection between the battlefront and civilian communities during the World War II)

See also
Ministry of Information
Ministry of propaganda
National data protection authorities
Information commissioner

 
 
Information